Ray Otto "Waddy" Kuehl (February 12, 1893 – July 24, 1967), was an American football player who played five seasons in the National Football League (NFL) with the Rock Island Independents (1920, 1923), Detroit Tigers (1921), Buffalo All-Americans (1921-1922), and Dayton Triangles (1924).  He appeared in 39 NFL games and scored nine touchdowns.  On October 10, 1920, the second week of the first NFL season, Kuehl is credited with catching the first touchdown pass in NFL history — a 35-yard completion from Pudge Wyman against Hammond. He played college football at St. Ambrose University and Dubuque College (now known as Loras College), both located in Iowa.  He retired from the game in 1925.

References

1893 births
1967 deaths
Players of American football from Iowa
Detroit Tigers (NFL) players
Rock Island Independents players
Buffalo All-Americans players
Dayton Triangles players
St. Ambrose Fighting Bees football players
Sportspeople from Davenport, Iowa